Marcelo Lipatín López (born January 28, 1977) is a Uruguayan professional football (soccer) player.

Playing career
In July 2008, Lipatin was offered a contract from Maccabi Tel Aviv after they discovered that Lipatin's father is Jewish and his mother converted to Judaism. This would allow him to play in Israel and not count as a foreigner.

After his negotiations with Maccabi failed, he was offered to city rivals Hapoel Tel Aviv.

Club statistics

Footnotes

External links

1977 births
Living people
Footballers from Montevideo
Uruguayan people of Jewish descent
Uruguayan Christians
Uruguayan footballers
Uruguayan expatriate footballers
Montevideo Wanderers F.C. players
Defensor Sporting players
Coritiba Foot Ball Club players
Grêmio Foot-Ball Porto Alegrense players
Yokohama F. Marinos players
Club América footballers
S.S.C. Bari players
C.S. Marítimo players
Expatriate footballers in Brazil
Expatriate footballers in Japan
Serie B players
J1 League players
Primeira Liga players
PAS Giannina F.C. players
Super League Greece players
Campeonato Brasileiro Série A players
Uruguayan Primera División players
Liga MX players
C.D. Nacional players
C.D. Trofense players
Expatriate footballers in Italy
Expatriate footballers in Greece
Expatriate footballers in Portugal
Uruguayan expatriate sportspeople in Portugal
Association football forwards